Victor LaValle (born February 3, 1972) is an American author. He is the author of a short-story collection, Slapboxing with Jesus, and four novels, The Ecstatic, Big Machine, The Devil in Silver, and The Changeling. His fantasy-horror novella The Ballad of Black Tom won the 2016 Shirley Jackson Award for best novella. LaValle writes fiction primarily, though he has also written essays and book reviews for GQ, Essence Magazine, The Fader, and The Washington Post, among other publications.

Early life
Victor LaValle was born on February 3, 1972, and raised in the Flushing and Rosedale neighborhoods of Queens, New York by a single mother who had emigrated from Uganda in her twenties. He attended Woodmere Academy and went on to earn a degree in English from Cornell University and a Master of Fine Arts in Creative Writing from Columbia University.

Literary career
Slapboxing with Jesus was published in 1999 by Vintage Books. The eleven interconnected stories deal mostly with the lives of young black and Latino men living in New York in the 1970s and 1980s. The collection went on to receive wide critical praise. It won the author a PEN Open Book Award and the Key to Jamaica, Queens.

The Ecstatic was published in 2002 by Crown Publishing Group. The novel continues the story of Anthony James, a character from LaValle's collection of stories. Anthony is a morbidly obese college dropout who may also be experiencing the first signs of schizophrenia. The novel follows the exploits of his family, who are trying their best to save Anthony, but who might be in need of a little saving themselves. The subject matter is dark, and even shocking, but a gallows humor runs throughout. This book received even wider critical acclaim, earning comparisons to writers such as Ken Kesey, Chester Himes, and John Kennedy Toole. In 2003 the novel was a finalist for both the PEN/Faulkner Award for Fiction and the Hurston-Wright Legacy Award. It became a favorite novel for rapper Mos Def, who later titled his 2009 studio album after it.

Big Machine was published in 2009 by Spiegel & Grau. The novel tells the story of Ricky Rice, an ex-junkie survivor of a suicide cult whose life is changed when a mysterious letter arrives summoning him to a remote compound in Vermont. The novel was widely praised upon its release, making many national top ten lists. It also won the Shirley Jackson Award for Best Novel in 2009, as well as the Ernest J. Gaines Award for Literary Excellence and an American Book Award in 2010.

The Devil in Silver, published by Spiegel & Grau in August 21, 2012, is the story of Pepper, a sane man sent for observation to a mental hospital.  There he encounters a monster known as the Devil roaming the nighttime halls. He teams up with other patients to fight the mental confusion of the drugs he is required to take, the staff, and the monster.

The Ballad of Black Tom, a novella, was published by Tor Books on February 16, 2016. It is a retelling of the H. P. Lovecraft story "The Horror at Red Hook" from the point of view of a young black man living in Harlem with a reference to the Nation of Gods and Earths.

The Changeling was published in 2017 by Spiegel & Grau and received critical acclaim. It was selected as one of 2017's ten best books by New York Public Library and won a 2018 World Fantasy Award for Best Novel, the 2018 Locus Award for Horror Novel, and the 2018 British Fantasy Award for Horror Novel.

Destroyer, a graphic novel published in 2017 by Boom! Studios, is a modern retelling of Frankenstein. The story follows an African-American descendant of Dr. Frankenstein, her only son who was killed in a police encounter, and the monster from the original novel who has long given up on peace.

Personal life
LaValle is an associate professor at the Columbia University School of the Arts. He lives in New York with his wife, novelist Emily Raboteau, son and daughter.

Awards and nominations

Literature awards

Honors 

1998: Fine Arts Work Center, Fiction Fellow
2000: Breadloaf Writer's Fellowship
2004: Whiting Award
2006: United States Artists Ford Fellowship
2010: Guggenheim Fellowship
2010–2011: Dutch Foundation for Literature, Writer-in-Residence, Amsterdam
2016: This is Horror Novella of the Year ("The Ballad of Black Tom")

Best of lists by magazines, editorials 

 2009: Chicago Tribune "Favorite Fiction of 2009" – Big Machine
 2009: Los Angeles Times "Best Science Fiction of 2009" – Big Machine
 2009: in The Nation, John Nichols list "MVPs of 2009": Most Valuable Fiction Book – Big Machine
 2009: Publishers Weekly "Top 10 Best Books of 2009" – Big Machine
 2009: Washington Post "Best Books of 2009" – Big Machine
 2012: New York Times "100 Notable Books of 2012" – The Devil in Silver
 2012: Publishers Weekly "Top 10 Best Books of 2012" – The Devil in Silver
 2012: Washington Post "Best Books of 2012" – The Devil in Silver
 2017: New York Times "100 Notable Books of 2017" – The Changeling

Works

Books
 
 
 
 
 
 

As Editor, with John Joseph Adams:

Essays

Comics

Notes

External links
Website

 Personal website
 Victor LaValle on Twitter
 Victor LaValle at Goodreads
 
 Victor LaValle on Fantastic Fiction
 Profile  at The Whiting Foundation

Free reading
The Ecstatic online at Archive.org
Big Machine online at Archive.org
The Devil in Silver online at Archive.org
Novel reviews
Slapboxing with Jesus review by SFGate
The Ecstatic  review by Austin Chronicle
Big Machine, review by Wall Street Journal
LaValle written reviews and interviews
LaValle reviews two story collections for Washington Post.
Extensive interview about "Narrative Voice" and writing craft.
"Admiring Oe's Talent for Discomfort", Victor LaValle discusses Nobel Laureate Kenzaburō Ōe in 2006 on NPR, August 3, 2006
Interview in 2021 with Pop-Talk Podcast of WAER-FM
United States Artists Videos

1972 births
Living people
20th-century African-American writers
20th-century American male writers
20th-century American novelists
21st-century African-American writers
21st-century American male writers
21st-century American novelists
African-American male writers
African-American novelists
American Book Award winners
American horror novelists
American male novelists
American people of Ugandan descent
Black speculative fiction authors
Columbia University School of the Arts alumni
Cornell University alumni
Lawrence Woodmere Academy alumni
Novelists from New York (state)
PEN/Faulkner Award for Fiction winners
People from Flushing, Queens
People from Rosedale, Queens
Weird fiction writers
World Fantasy Award-winning writers